Outwood Academy Kirkby (formerly Kirkby Comprehensive School and then Kirkby College) is a mixed secondary school located in Kirkby-in-Ashfield town centre, Nottinghamshire, England.

Previously a foundation school administered by Nottinghamshire County Council, Kirkby College converted to academy status on 1 August 2012. The school continues to coordinate with Nottinghamshire County Council for admissions.

In September 2022 Kirby College joined the Outwood Grange Academies Trust, and was renamed Outwood Academy Kirkby.

References

External links
Outwood Academy Kirkby official website

Academies in Nottinghamshire
Kirkby-in-Ashfield
Secondary schools in Nottinghamshire
Kirkby